The 2019 IIHF U18 World Championship Division I were a pair of international under-18 ice hockey tournaments organised by the International Ice Hockey Federation. The Division I A and Division I B tournaments represented the second and the third tier of the IIHF World U18 Championship.

Division I A

The Division I A tournament was played in Grenoble, France, from 14 to 20 April 2019.

Participants

Match officials
4 referees and 7 linesmen were selected for the tournament.

Referees
 Michał Baca
 Andrea Benvegnù
 Alex DiPietro
 Ivan Fateev

Linesmen
 Joris Barcelo
 Maksim Bersenev
 Nicholas Briganti
 Daniel Duarte
 Julien Fournier
 Jiří Svoboda
 Chris van Grinsven

Standings

Results
All times are local (UTC+2).

Statistics

Scoring leaders
List shows the top ten skaters sorted by points, then goals.

 GP = Games played; G = Goals; A = Assists; Pts = Points; +/− = Plus-minus; PIM = Penalties in minutes; POS = PositionSource: IIHF

Leading goaltenders
Only the top five goaltenders, based on save percentage, who have played 40% of their team's minutes are included in this list.

 TOI = Time On Ice (minutes:seconds); SA = Shots against; GA = Goals against; GAA = Goals against average; Sv% = Save percentage; SO = ShutoutsSource: IIHF

Awards
Best Players Selected by the Directorate
 Goaltender:  Frederik Nissen
 Defenceman:  Madi Dikhanbek
 Forward:  Tim Stützle
Source: IIHF

Division I B

The Division I B tournament was played in Székesfehérvár, Hungary, from 14 to 20 April 2019.

Participants

Match officials
4 referees and 7 linesmen were selected for the tournament.

Referees
 Martin Christensen
 Adrien Ernecq
 Grainge Phillips
 Trpimir Piragić

Linesmen
 Tomislav Grozaj
 Lukáš Kacej
 Johan Löfgren
 Attila Nagy
 Anton Peretyatko
 Laurynas Stepankevičius
 Dávid Váczi

Standings

Results
All times are local (UTC+2).

Statistics

Scoring leaders
List shows the top ten skaters sorted by points, then goals.

 GP = Games played; G = Goals; A = Assists; Pts = Points; +/− = Plus-minus; PIM = Penalties in minutes; POS = PositionSource: IIHF

Leading goaltenders
Only the top five goaltenders, based on save percentage, who have played 40% of their team's minutes are included in this list.

 TOI = Time On Ice (minutes:seconds); SA = Shots against; GA = Goals against; GAA = Goals against average; Sv% = Save percentage; SO = ShutoutsSource: IIHF

Awards
Best Players Selected by the Directorate
 Goaltender:  Eiki Sato
 Defenceman:  Thimo Nickl
 Forward:  Chikara Hanzawa
Source: IIHF

References

2019 IIHF World U18 Championships
IIHF World U18 Championship Division I
International ice hockey competitions hosted by France
International ice hockey competitions hosted by Hungary
Sports competitions in Grenoble
Sport in Székesfehérvár
2018–19 in French ice hockey
2018–19 in Hungarian ice hockey
IIHF
21st century in Grenoble